Jokin Arcaya Esparza (born 15 June 1988) is a Spanish professional footballer who plays as a left midfielder.

Club career
Esparza was born in Pamplona, Navarre. After emerging through local CA Osasuna's youth academy, he made his La Liga debut on 17 June 2007 in a 1–2 home loss against Atlético Madrid. He would only appear in five more matches for the first team in the following two seasons combined, however, which prompted a loan to Segunda División club SD Huesca in January 2009; he was relatively used during his first spell, as they retained their recently acquired status.

For the 2010–11 campaign, Esparza was again loaned to Huesca in a season-long move. In August 2011, he signed a permanent deal with the Aragonese.

In February 2013, Esparza joined Panathinaikos FC of the Superleague Greece, agreeing to a six-month contract. In late May of the following year, after a brief spell back in his country with lowly Zamora CF, he moved to another Greek top flight side, Veria FC.

References

External links

1988 births
Living people
Footballers from Pamplona
Spanish footballers
Association football midfielders
La Liga players
Segunda División players
Segunda División B players
Tercera División players
CA Osasuna B players
CA Osasuna players
SD Huesca footballers
Zamora CF footballers
CD Toledo players
Mérida AD players
Super League Greece players
Panathinaikos F.C. players
Veria F.C. players
Spain youth international footballers
Spanish expatriate footballers
Expatriate footballers in Greece
Spanish expatriate sportspeople in Greece